Historectomy is a promo compilation album from alternative rock band The Afghan Whigs, released in September, 1998 on Columbia.

Track listing

 "Somethin’ Hot"
 "Uptown Again"
 "Going To Town"
 "Blame, Etc."
 "Gentlemen"
 "Debonair"
 "What Jail Is Like"
 "Conjure Me"

Track 8: from Congregation (see 1992 in music)
Tracks 5, 6, 7: from Gentlemen (see 1993 in music)
Tracks 3, 4: from Black Love (see 1996 in music)
Tracks: 1, 2: from 1965 (see 1998 in music)

References

The Afghan Whigs albums
1998 compilation albums
Columbia Records compilation albums